The 1978 World's Strongest Man was the second edition of World's Strongest Man and was won by Bruce Wilhelm from the United States. It was his second title. Don Reinhoudt also from the United States finished second, and Lars Hedlund from Sweden third. The contest was held at the Universal Studios, California.

Final results

References

External links
 Official site

World's Strongest
World's Strongest Man
1978 in sports in California
1978 in American sports